Maria Gunilla Johansson Tovle (born 7 April 1956 in Stockholm) is a Swedish actress, film director and professor at the Stockholm Academy of Dramatic Arts.

In 1963, at the age of 6, Johansson auditioned for the part of "Tjorven" in the TV series Vi på Saltkråkan written by Astrid Lindgren, and was accepted. She played Tjorven in the series as well as in four subsequent full-length movies produced in 1964-1967.

Johansson studied at the Swedish National Academy of Mime and Acting until 1981. She worked as a film, TV, and theatre actress until 1998, when she started working as a director. She became interested in research on acting, and received a master's degree and a PhD at Södertörn University. Her PhD thesis from 2012 is called Skådespelarens praktiska kunskap (The actor's practical knowledge).

She is Professor of Research in the Arts at the Stockholm Academy of Dramatic Arts.

Selected filmography
1981 - Operation Leo
1981 - Tuppen
1981 - The Simple-Minded Murder
1987 - Daghemmet Lyckan (TV)
1988 - Liv i luckan (TV)
1996 - Juloratoriet
1998 - Skärgårdsdoktorn (TV)

References

External links

1956 births
Swedish film directors
Swedish women film directors
Swedish film actresses
Living people
Actresses from Stockholm
Södertörn University alumni